HMS Antelope was a Royal Navy Alarm-class torpedo gunboat.  She was launched in 1893, reduced to harbour service from 1910 and was sold for scrapping in 1919.

Design
The Alarm class was designed by Sir William White in 1889. Antelope was engined by Yarrows with two sets of vertical triple-expansion steam engines, two locomotive-type boilers, and twin screws. She carried between 100 and 160 tons of coal and was manned by 91 sailors and officers.

Armament
When built Antelope was fitted with two QF /45-pounder guns, four 3-pounder guns and one Gardner machine gun.  Her three 18-inch torpedo tubes were arranged as a pair of revolving deck mounts and a single bow-mounted tube; three reloads were provided.

History

Construction 
Antelope was laid down at Devonport Dockyard on 21 October 1889. Construction was delayed by several months by problems with the ship's propeller shafts. She was finally launched, by Miss Crocker, the daughter of the shipyard manager on 12 July 1893. In 2015, her grandson displayed a commemorative wooden box, holding the mallet and chisel she used to server the rope tethering the ship, on the BBC programme Antiques Roadshow. The ship was completed in May 1894 at a cost of £61,395.

Service
In August 1894 Antelope took part in that year's Naval Manoeuvres, and in July 1896 again took part in the Manoeuvres, On 26 June 1897 she was present at the Fleet Review at Spithead in celebration of Queen Victoria's Diamond Jubilee, and in July that year took part in the Reserve Fleet Manoeuvres. In April 1899, it was announced that Antelope was to be allocated to training of naval reserves, supporting the training Hulk  at Bristol.

On 27 June 1900 it was announced that the date of the mobilization for naval manoeuvres had been fixed for 10 July. Antelope, together with capital ships, cruisers, torpedo boats and other torpedo gunboats, was ordered to be ready for sea, and took part as part of 'Fleet B'. In July the next year Antelope took part in the 1901 manoeuvres.

Commander Henry Arthur Phillips was appointed in command in early May 1902, and in July 1902 she rejoined the Channel and Home squadrons. She took part in the fleet review held at Spithead on 16 August 1902 for the coronation of King Edward VII. Commander William Nicholson was appointed in command on 10 September 1902.

Antelope had been stricken from the effective list by 1905, being described in Parliament as being "of comparatively small fighting value", although her armament was not removed. Torpedo gunboats that had been re-boilered and re-engined were considered still effective and retained in service, but it was not felt worthwhile to re-engine the remaining torpedo gunboats, such as Antelope. Antelope was reduced to harbour service from 1910 and used as a training ship at Devonport.

In July 1914 she was listed for sale at Devonport. Following the outbreak of the First World War, Antelope returned to training duties at Devonport, where she was used for training of stokers.

Disposal
Antelope was sold to T R Sales for breaking on 27 May 1919.

Pennant numbers

Notes

References

Bibliography
 
 
 
 
 

 
 
 
 
 

 

Alarm-class torpedo gunboats
Ships built in Chatham
1893 ships
Victorian-era gunboats of the United Kingdom
World War I naval ships of the United Kingdom